Józef Konrad Paczoski  (1864-1942) was an eminent Polish botanist, who coined the term "Phytosociology" and was one of the founders of this branch of botany.

Early life and education
Paczoski was born on 8 December 1864 in Byalohorodka near Iziaslav, Ukraine in Volhynia. From 1877 he studied botany at faculty of Biological Science at Jagiellonian University and Kiev University under the guidance of Ivan Ivanovich Schmalhausen.

Career

He was an early pioneer of the science of phytosociology, the study of natural plant communities. In 1896 he coined the term "phytosociology". In 1923 he became a scientific manager of the forest reserves in the Białowieża Forest. He did much of his research on the vegetation of the Białowieża National Park.  From 1925 to 1931 he was Professor of Plant Systematics and Sociology at Poznań University, where he established the first Institute of Plant Sociology in the world. 

He was a member of the Polish Academy of Learning (Polska Akademia Umiejętności), the predecessor of the Polish Academy of Sciences.

Death 
He died on 14 February 1942 in Sierosław near Poznań, Poland of a heart attack, when he heard that his grandson had been injured by the Gestapo as Poland was occupied at that time by Nazi Germany.

Plant species named after Jozef Paczoski 
 Allium paczoskianum
 Centaurea paczoskyi
 Hieracium paczoskianum
 Jurinea paczoskiana
 Pyrethrum paczoskii
 Tanacetum paczoskii
 Carex paczoskii
 Lamium paczoskianum
 Chamaecytisus paczoskii (Krecz.)
 Cytisus paczoskii
 Onobrychis paczoskiana
 Gagea paczoskii (Zapal.)
 Corydalis paczoskii
 Papaver paczoskii
 Pistolochia paczoskii
 Veronica paczoskiana

Publications 
 Paczoski J. 1927. Ranunculaceae. In: Szafer W (ed.) Flora polska : Rośliny naczyniowe Polski i ziem ościennych (Polish: Flora of Poland: Vascular plants of Poland and adjacent territories). Vol. III. Kraków: Polska Akademja Umiejętności
 Paczoski J. 1928. La végétation de la Foret de Białowieża (French: The Vegetation of Białowieża Forest). Varsovie.
 Paczoski J. 1928. Biologiczna struktura lasu (Polish : The Biological Structure of Forest). Sylwan 3: 193 - 221.
 Paczoski J. 1929. Die Wälder Bosniens (German: The Forests of Bosnia). Lwów: Polskie Towarzystwo Leśne.
 Paczoski J. 1930. Lasy Białowieży (Polish: The Forests of Białowieża). Monografje Naukowe 1. Warszawa: Państwowa Rada Ochrony Przyrody.
 Paczoski J. 1933. Podstawowe zagadnienia geografji roślin (Polish: Basic concepts in plant geography). Biblioteka Botaniczna. Vol. III. Poznań: Wydawnictwo Polskiego Towarzystwa Botanicznego.
 Paczoski J. 1935. Piętrowość lasu (Polish: Layers of forest vegetation). Biblioteka Botaniczna. Vol. IV. Poznań: Wydawnictwo Polskiego Towarzystwa Botanicznego.

References 

20th-century Polish botanists
1864 births
1942 deaths
19th-century Polish botanists
Academic staff of Adam Mickiewicz University in Poznań
Jagiellonian University alumni
Taras Shevchenko National University of Kyiv alumni